Kevin Michael Harvick (born December 8, 1975) is an American professional stock car racing driver. He competes full-time in the NASCAR Cup Series, driving the No. 4 Ford Mustang for Stewart-Haas Racing.

Harvick is the 2014 Cup Series champion, as well as the 2001 and 2006 Xfinity Series champion, and 2007 Daytona 500 winner. Harvick holds the all-time record for Cup Series wins at Phoenix Raceway with nine wins. Harvick's 121 combined national series wins currently rank him third all-time in NASCAR history, behind Richard Petty and Kyle Busch, respectively, while his 60 Cup wins are tied for ninth in series history. He is the longest-tenured active driver in the Cup Series. He began his NASCAR career in 1992, is the third of only six drivers that have won a championship in both the Cup Series and the Xfinity Series, and the fifth of only 36 drivers to win a race in each of NASCAR's three national series.

Harvick is the former owner of Kevin Harvick Incorporated, a race team that fielded cars in the Xfinity Series from 2004 to 2011 and the Truck Series between 2001 and 2011. In the media, he has sometimes been nicknamed "The Closer" and "Happy Harvick".

Early life
Harvick was born in 1975 in Bakersfield, California, to parents Mike and JoNell (Walker) Harvick, and has a younger sister, Amber. He began kart racing at an early age, after his parents bought him a go-kart as a kindergarten graduation gift. Harvick grew up a fan of IndyCar driver and fellow Bakersfield native Rick Mears, and raced go-karts with Mears' son Clint. He achieved considerable success on the go-kart racing circuit, earning seven national championships and two Grand National championships.

While in high school, Harvick began racing late models part-time in 1992 in the NASCAR Featherlite Southwest Series. During the racing offseason, he competed on the North High School wrestling team, qualifying for a CIF Central Section title in his weight class his senior year. Harvick also played baseball, basketball, football, and soccer. After graduation, he attended Bakersfield College with the intention of majoring in architecture, but later dropped out in order to pursue a full-time racing career.

NASCAR career

Early career
Harvick made his Craftsman Truck Series debut in 1995 at the Mesa Marin Raceway, in his hometown of Bakersfield, where he started and finished 27th in his family-owned No. 72. He drove four races in the No. 72 the next season, his best finish was 11th at Mesa Marin. In 1997, he signed to drive the No. 75 for Spears Motorsports mid-season, posting two eighth-place finishes. He ran a full schedule the next season, posting 3 top-fives and finishing 17th in points. Harvick also moved up to the NASCAR Grand National Division, AutoZone West Series in 1997, and in 1998 Harvick won five races on his way to the Winston West Series championship while driving for Spears. He received his first real national exposure during the winter of 1997/1998 on ESPN2's coverage of the NASCAR Winter Heat Series at Tucson Raceway Park. In 1999, he drove the No. 98 Porter Cable Ford for Liberty Racing, finishing 12th in points with six top-fives.

1999–2000: NASCAR Busch Series
On October 23, 1999, Harvick made his first NASCAR Busch Series start in the Kmart 200 at the Rockingham Speedway in the No. 2 Chevrolet. He would start 24th and finish 42nd due to engine failure. The race would be his only start in 1999. In 2000, Harvick would sign with Richard Childress Racing to drive the No. 2 Chevrolet for his first full Busch Series season. Despite failing to qualify for the second race of the season at Rockingham, Harvick would go on to win the NASCAR Busch Series Rookie of the Year with three wins, eight top-five finishes, and 16 top-tens as well as garnering third-place points finish.

2001: Cup Series debut

For 2001, Childress planned to run Harvick in the No. 2 Chevy in the Busch Series full-time again, while developing him into the Winston Cup Series with up to seven races in the No. 30 Chevy. He planned to race Harvick for a full schedule in 2002. The death of Dale Earnhardt on the last lap of the 2001 Daytona 500 changed Childress's plans, and Harvick began his first Cup race the following week in the Dura Lube 400 at Rockingham, filling the seat vacated by Earnhardt's passing in the renumbered No. 29 Chevrolet.

On March 11, 2001, in the Cracker Barrel Old Country Store 500 at Atlanta Motor Speedway, only three weeks after Earnhardt's death, Harvick won his first career Winston Cup race in just his third start by narrowly edging Jeff Gordon. He won the race by only six one-thousandths of a second (.006). After the win, he paid tribute to Earnhardt, driving on the track backward with three fingers held aloft outside the driver's window as a show of honor and respect. At the time, this broke the record for earliest career start for a driver to win a race, since surpassed by Jamie McMurray and Trevor Bayne, both of whom accomplished the feat in their second starts.

He won his second career Cup race at Chicagoland Speedway in Joliet, Illinois. At the end of the season, he finished with two victories, six Top 5s, and 16 Top 10s. Harvick was awarded the NASCAR Rookie of the Year Award and secured a ninth-place finish in the 2001 points standings. He also won the Busch Series championship, becoming the first driver to win the Busch Series championship while also driving full-time in the Winston Cup Series with a Top 10 finish. Harvick would end the season winning six pole positions, and making 69 starts: 35 in Cup Series, an appearance in the Winston, 33 in the Busch Series, and one in the Craftsman Truck Series at Richmond International Raceway for Rick Carelli.

2002
In 2002, Harvick would spend the season concentrating on running the Cup Series and would only start four races in the Busch Series. Harvick began the 2002 season making his first Daytona 500 start on the outside pole next to Jimmie Johnson, but his day ended after triggering an 18-car crash on lap 148 while running second to Jeff Gordon, relegating him to a 36th-place finish. Later in the season, he was fined for a post-race incident with Greg Biffle at Bristol Motor Speedway. Harvick was also suspended for rough driving in a Truck race at Martinsville, in which he announced on his radio that he intentionally spun out driver Coy Gibbs, prompting NASCAR to immediately take him out of the race. Even though it was heard on the radio that he did, Harvick lied in a post-race interview saying that he did not purposely wreck Gibbs. Harvick was banned from the Cup Series race the next day, with Kenny Wallace replacing him. Harvick rebounded and scored his first career Winston Cup pole position in the Pepsi 400 at Daytona. Later in the season, he took his third Cup win at Chicagoland Speedway. This would prove to be one of the only bright spots in a disappointing season, as he finished 21st in the 2002 points standings with one win, one pole, five Top 5s, and eight Top 10s. Harvick became the 2002 IROC Champion in his first season in the Series, winning at California Speedway. In Trucks, Harvick began fielding his own No. 6 truck, driving himself in five races and winning at Phoenix.

2003

In the 2003 season, Harvick teamed with crew chief Todd Berrier in the Cup Series, with whom he had won the Busch championship in 2001. Together, they won the Brickyard 400 at Indianapolis. Harvick and his team jumped to fifth in the 2003 point standings, coming within 252 points of Matt Kenseth. In the Busch Series, Harvick was teamed with Johnny Sauter, driving the No. 21 Hershey's-sponsored PayDay car. The two would combine for three wins, 16 Top 5s, and 24 Top 10s, with Harvick posting all three wins. They would give Childress the NASCAR Busch Series owners' championship that season. Harvick competed in 19 of the 34 races, and Sauter competed in the other 15. Harvick also scored eight pole positions and finished 16th in the final drivers' standings.

2004: First winless season
On August 28 during the 2004 Sharpie 500 at Bristol Motor Speedway, Harvick had one of the most bizarre sequences of events happen to him. On lap 323, Harvick radioed to his crew that his right arm had fallen asleep on him and had gone numb which made it difficult for him to operate his race car properly and needed a backup driver. The caution came out 5 laps later and Harvick made his way onto pit road and was pulled out of the car. He was replaced by Kyle Petty, who was involved in an earlier wreck in the same race. Petty finished 24th 6 laps down for Harvick. Harvick was still able to stay 8th in points but in the last 2 regular season races at California and Richmond, Harvick would fall from 8th to 15th in the standings missing out on the inaugural Chase for the Cup. While winless in the 2004 Cup season, Harvick placed third in the voting for Most Popular Driver. He had fourteen Top 10 finishes and finished 14th in points. Harvick was paired with another driver in the Busch Series, rookie Clint Bowyer. They combined for one win, 13 Top 5s, and 20 Top 10s in the No. 21 car, with Reese's Peanut Butter Cups as a sponsor. Harvick drove the No. 29 Busch car in the final race of the season at Homestead–Miami Speedway in the Ford 300, which he would claim his second win of the season. He finished 14th in the final standings. The No. 21 car finished fourth in the owner's standings.

2005
In the 2005 season, Harvick's only Cup win came at the Food City 500 at Bristol Motor Speedway, despite starting towards the rear of the field. He won without the assistance of crew chief Todd Berrier, who was serving a four-week suspension for a rules violation. In the Busch Series, Harvick was paired with Brandon Miller. Harvick and Miller combined for 3 wins, 15 top-fives, and 19 top-tens to give the No. 21 its second fourth-place finish in the owner's standings. Harvick would win his first "sweep" of his career at Bristol, winning both the Sharpie Professional 250 Busch race and the Food City 500 Cup race, also giving him a record fourth Busch Series win at the track (tying with Morgan Shepherd). Harvick finished 14th in the Cup series standings and 18th in the Busch series driver's standings.

2006: Second Busch Championship and first Chase appearance

In 2006, Harvick decided to run both of NASCAR's Top 2 series full-time. In the Busch Series, Harvick would be scheduled to run all 35 races, with three different cars. He ran four races for his team in the No. 33, the season opener at Daytona in Childress' No. 29, and the remaining 30 races for RCR's No. 21. He won his first Busch Series race of the 2006 season at Nashville Superspeedway. He followed the win with a weekend sweep of the Busch Series and Sprint Cup races at Phoenix International Raceway. Harvick had nine wins, 23 Top 5s, and 32 Top 10s in the Busch Series. He clinched the 2006 NASCAR Busch Series championship on October 13, 2006, at Lowe's Motor Speedway in the Dollar General 300. It was the earliest clinch of the championship ever in the Busch Series, locking up the title with four races to go. He ended the season with a record 824-point margin in the final standings.

In the Nextel Cup series, Harvick, along with teammate Jeff Burton, scored the first berths for Richard Childress Racing in the Chase for the Cup. Harvick would have 3 wins, 11 top-5's and 14 top-10s going into the chase.

After a dominant win at New Hampshire, Harvick would have a substandard Chase run. He fell to sixth place in the point standings until he finished third at Texas. Following that was another dominating performance in the Checker Auto Parts 500 at Phoenix International Raceway on November 12. Harvick would win that race, moving him up to third in points. At the season finale at Homestead-Miami Speedway, Harvick would finish fifth in the race and slip to fourth in the final standings to eventual 2006 NASCAR Sprint Cup Series champion Jimmie Johnson.

2007: Daytona 500 win
Harvick opened the 2007 Sprint Cup series with a dramatic final lap pass in the Daytona 500, beating Mark Martin by .020 seconds in a green-white-checkered finish, the closest margin at the 500 since electronic scoring started in 1993. He would become only the fourth NASCAR driver to sweep both the Nationwide and Cup races in the opening weekend at Daytona. With the win, Harvick also became the sixth of eight drivers to win both the Daytona 500 and the Brickyard 400, following Jeff Gordon, Dale Earnhardt, Dale Jarrett, Bill Elliott, Jimmie Johnson, and preceding Jamie McMurray and Ryan Newman. Harvick would be quiet for the remainder of the season, his only other win coming in the Sprint All-Star Race and finishing 10th in points.

In 2007, Harvick started the Nationwide Series season by winning the Orbitz 300 at Daytona, claiming his first win in a restrictor-plate race, as well as the first win for new sponsor AutoZone in NASCAR's Nationwide Series. He also won at New Hampshire International Speedway, winning the Camping World 200 presented by RVs.com. He also ended up unexpectedly winning the inaugural race at Montreal in August, the NAPA Auto Parts 200, after with two laps to go, leader Robby Gordon was black-flagged for intentionally causing a crash involving rookie Marcos Ambrose. The win was considered a bit of an upset as many expected the road course ringers to dominate and Harvick had started 43rd in the race due to a driver change.

2008: Second winless season

Harvick went winless in 2008, but he was still able to post a fourth-place ranking in the 2008 Chase for the Sprint Cup. The fourth-place finish in the 2008 standings tied 2006 for his highest points position at the end of the season. Harvick also went the entire season without a single DNF for the second straight year. In the Nationwide Series, he ran twenty-two races for his team with sponsorship from Camping World, Rheem, and RoadLoans. He did not win a race in this series either. His lone win came in a Truck race at Phoenix.

2009: Third winless season

Harvick started the 2009 season by winning the Budweiser Shootout with a last-lap pass on Jamie McMurray. After Harvick damaged his primary car for the 2009 Daytona 500, his team switched to his Shootout car and he finished second when the race was declared official early due to rain.

This wasn't his worst season, despite the point standings. He didn't get a single win in the cup series this year knowing that he was successful in the Nationwide series and the truck series, having a total of 5 wins this season. Auto Club in California, Harvick blew his engine and suffered his first DNF in 82 starts. He won the first 2009 Nationwide Series race at Bristol, his first win in his car. In addition, he won the Camping World Truck Series race at Martinsville Speedway. During the season, Gil Martin became the new crew chief for Harvick as Childress decided to switch all team members of the No. 07 and No. 29 except the drivers and spotters, thus giving Casey Mears Harvick's crew chief Todd Berrier. In the first five races following the switch, Harvick finished with an average of 25.4, finishing 34th, 11th, 41st, 17th, and 24th respectively. A short time later, reports surfaced stating that Harvick had asked for a release of his contract at the end of the 2009 season to join Stewart-Haas Racing for the 2010 season. Harvick did not comment publicly on the subject of where he would be driving in 2010. His best race came at the Pep Boys Auto 500 at Atlanta Motor Speedway, where Harvick had the best car in a long run and led for most of the race, but was denied victory after a late-race caution from which later eventual race winner Kasey Kahne took advantage of when he went past Harvick on the restart; he finished second. He would miss the chase for the first time since 2005 and finished a disappointing 19th in the final standings.

2010: Redemption
Harvick's 2010 season was considered a bounce-back year. He started the same way he did in 2009 by winning the Budweiser Shootout with a pass in the penultimate lap in a green-white-checkered situation. Harvick placed second in his Gatorade Duel by inches to Jimmie Johnson. He led the most laps in the Daytona 500 but ended up finishing seventh.  He followed up his seventh at Daytona with a second at Auto Club Speedway again to Jimmie Johnson. After the race, Harvick told media members that the No. 48 team (of Johnson) "had a golden horseshoe stuck up their ass". Following the race, Harvick followed up with another second-place finish to Johnson at Las Vegas Motor Speedway. He won the Aaron's 499 after three green-white-checkered situations, passing Jamie McMurray in what was the 88th lead change of the race, setting a new NASCAR record. On July 3, Harvick captured his second win of the year by winning the Coke Zero 400 at Daytona. On August 15, Harvick captured his third win of the year by winning the Carfax 400 at Michigan. His win at Michigan locked him into the Chase for the Sprint Cup for the fourth time. He finished the regular season first place in points but started the Chase in third after the points were adjusted.  During the 10-race Chase, Harvick scored five top-fives and nine top-tens. Despite scoring an average finish of 5.8 (best in the 2010 Chase and third-best all-time in the Chase), Harvick finished third overall, 41 points behind 2010 Champion Jimmie Johnson.

Harvick also won his first career Pole in the Camping World Truck Series at Gateway International Raceway in his own No. 2 Chevrolet Silverado. This added Harvick to the shortlist of NASCAR drivers who have won a pole award and a race in each of NASCAR's three major series.

2011: Feud with Kyle Busch

With the departure of Royal Dutch Shell at the end of 2010, the No. 29 teams were searching for a new sponsor. In August 2010, it was announced that for 2011, the car's primary sponsor would be with Budweiser for 20 races. Adding to Harvick's new sponsorship, on January 25, 2011, Jimmy John's and Richard Childress Racing reached a multi-year agreement to sponsor the No. 29 Sprint Cup team for 6 races in 2011. Harvick won his 15th career Cup race at Auto Club Speedway after passing defending series champion, Jimmie Johnson in the final turn in a finish resembling the previous race in 2010. As a joke to Harvick's words in 2010, Johnson asked Harvick in post-race ceremonies if "I can have my golden horseshoe back." Harvick took his second consecutive win of the year at Martinsville Speedway. Harvick then won the Coca-Cola 600 after Earnhardt Jr. ran out of fuel in the last turn on Lap 402. He would then later win at Richmond, narrowly beating Jeff Gordon due to a late-race pit stop that shuffled Harvick to the lead.

During the 2011 season, Kevin Harvick and fellow driver Kyle Busch were embroiled in a feud. After Harvick intentionally wrecked Busch at the 2010 Ford 400 at Homestead, he and Busch tangled several times during the 2011 seasons. A post-race incident at Darlington in May 2011 led NASCAR to put both drivers on probation and fining them $25,000. Later that season, Kyle Busch tangled with a bunch of drivers connected to Harvick's team such as Elliott Sadler and Ron Hornaday Jr. Harvick was able to finish well in all three series, finishing 3rd in points in Cup, and clenching the 2011 Truck Series Owner's Championship in his final season as a team owner.

At the season's end, Harvick announced that he would shut down Kevin Harvick, Inc. because he wanted to focus on winning a Sprint Cup Series championship. In his statement announcing the closure, Harvick said that the difference in costs of similar bodies between Nationwide and Cup Series cars made it mathematically impossible for a non-Cup-affiliated team to operate effectively. Harvick also admitted that his original goal in forming KHI was to achieve the success in the Truck Series that he wasn't able to get before driving in Winston Cup, and it blossomed into a venture to build drivers' careers. He sold KHI to Richard Childress.

2012
Although winless in the regular season, Harvick made the 2012 Chase through consistency. At Phoenix, Harvick avoided a chaos-filled race to collect his only win of the season and the 19th of his career. He went on to finish 8th in points.

2013: Final season at RCR

In 2013 at Daytona, Harvick dodged a practice wreck in the last session of practice, and the same in the Sprint Unlimited. Later, he would go on and tie Tony Stewart's and Dale Jarrett's record for wins in the Clash/Shootout/Unlimited. He also won his Budweiser Duel. He was caught up in a crash on lap 35 of the Daytona 500 and finished 41st. Harvick won his first race of the season at the 2013 Toyota Owners 400, which ended Kyle Busch's four-year winning streak in the spring Richmond race. At the Coca-Cola 600, Harvick took the lead on the last cycle of pit stops and held off Kasey Kahne to win his 2nd 600. Harvick won his first pole position since September 2006 in qualifying for the 2013 Hollywood Casino 400. He dominated the race, leading 138 laps, and survived a wreck-filled event to take his third win of the season. Harvick won his fourth race of the year at the Phoenix race, taking the lead at the white flag when Carl Edwards ran out of gas. His tenure at RCR came to an end the following week at Homestead-Miami with a 10th-place finish. Harvick finished the season third in points again, with four wins, nine Top 5s, 21 Top 10 finishes, and one pole position.

2014: Stewart-Haas Racing and Cup Series Championship
It was officially confirmed on January 22, 2013, that Harvick would be switching teams and joining Stewart-Haas for the 2014 season. Harvick and Childress said the parting was mutual and that it was time for Harvick to move on. Stewart-Haas Racing did not confirm what sponsor or number Harvick would be given. During the official reports it was reported, but not officially told, that Budweiser was interested in staying with Harvick. On July 12, 2013, it was confirmed that Harvick would drive the No. 4 Chevrolet, and would replace Ryan Newman, who parted ways with Stewart-Haas Racing at the end of the season. Harvick retained Budweiser as his primary sponsor for 21 races, with Jimmy John's sponsoring the remaining races for the 2014 season. In October, it was announced that Harvick would also run a partial schedule in the Nationwide Series in 2014, competing in a minimum of 12 races for JR Motorsports. Despite a second-place finish in his Budweiser Duel in a photo finish against Matt Kenseth and Kasey Kahne, Harvick failed post-race inspection, and his Duel finish was disallowed. As a result, Harvick started the Daytona 500 in 38th, getting in the 500 on a Provisional. Harvick ran upfront during the Daytona 500, but was caught up in a last-lap crash leaving turn 4, and was scored in the 13th position.

The following week at Phoenix, Harvick started 13th and dominated the race, leading 224 of 312 laps, holding off Dale Earnhardt Jr. and Brad Keselowski over the final seven laps to win. This was Harvick's first win for Stewart-Haas Racing and snapped a tie with Jimmie Johnson for most all-time wins at Phoenix.

However, following Phoenix came a bizarre five-race stretch in which Harvick finished 36th or worse four times, due to a hub failure at Las Vegas (41st), a cut oil line at Bristol (39th), a blown tire at Auto Club (36th), and an engine failure at Texas (42nd) – each time squandering one of the fastest cars on the track, as well as leading the most laps.

At Darlington, Harvick dominated the Bojangles' Southern 500 and overtook Dale Earnhardt Jr. on the final lap to win his second race for Stewart-Haas Racing. Harvick almost won the Coca-Cola 600 for the third time in four years, but a poor pit stop with 250 laps left cost him the race. He recovered to score a second-place finish but finished 5.55 seconds behind Jimmie Johnson.

Harvick won the pole, both at Michigan and Indianapolis. In the Irwin Tools Night Race, Harvick controlled the race early. His race, however, turned for the worse when Harvick was later penalized by NASCAR for speeding on pit road, ensuring an 11th-place finish. During the Chase, now using an elimination format, Harvick went on to win the Bank of America 500 at Charlotte, giving him his third win of the season and ensuring his advancement to the next round.

At Texas Motor Speedway, Harvick got a second-place finish but started controversy after instigating a fight between Jeff Gordon and Brad Keselowski on pit road immediately following the race.

At Phoenix, Harvick won the race and swept both 2014 races Phoenix, allowing him to transfer into the final round of the Chase at Homestead.

At Homestead–Miami Speedway, Harvick was consistent all day long, occasionally battling with Jeff Gordon for the lead. After a late caution, Harvick decided to pit with four tires. Rebounding after restarting outside the top 10, Harvick managed to reach the Top-5, when another caution occurred. Harvick took the lead away from Denny Hamlin, and in the end, held off fellow championship contender Ryan Newman to win the Ford Ecoboost 400 and the Sprint Cup Championship by one position over Newman. This was Kevin Harvick's first Sprint Cup Series championship in his career.

2015

In the Sprint Unlimited, Harvick scored an 11th-place finish despite receiving minor damage to his car from a wreck early in the race.

Harvick started the season by finishing second in the Daytona 500. At Las Vegas, Harvick held off Martin Truex Jr. to win his first race of the season. Harvick won again the very next week for his fourth straight win at Phoenix and a record seventh win at the track overall. At Auto Club, Harvick managed to finish second, this time to Brad Keselowski. This brought his streak of Top 2 finishes to eight races overall. It appeared Harvick was on track to tie Richard Petty for most straight Top 2 finishes, but this streak came to an end with an eighth-place finish at Martinsville.

Harvick then went on to collect four straight Top 10 finishes at Daytona, Kentucky, New Hampshire, and Indianapolis. In the first race of the Chase at Chicagoland, Harvick finished 42nd after getting a flat tire and spinning into the wall due to contact with Jimmie Johnson a few laps earlier on a restart. A confrontation took place after Harvick met with Johnson and lightly punched him in the chest. Harvick dominated next week at Loudon, leading 216 of 300 laps. However, he ran out of gas, allowing Matt Kenseth to win. Harvick finished 21st, putting him in danger of being eliminated from the Chase. The following week at Dover International Speedway, Harvick dominated a majority of the race to earn the third win of the season, leading 351 of 400 laps in the process. That win allowed Harvick to clinch a spot into the next round of the Chase, after narrowly avoiding being eliminated.

In the final race of the Round of 12 at Talladega, Harvick was again in a tough situation. During a green-white-checker restart, Harvick's car was unable to accelerate, which triggered a multi-car wreck. Due to the caution being displayed quickly after the leaders crossed the line, the race was considered official, and Joey Logano was declared the winner. Denny Hamlin, who was competing with Harvick for a spot in the next round, was caught up in the wreck and was eliminated from the Chase. Harvick managed to avoid the wreck, and finished 15th, advancing him to the next round in the Chase. Trevor Bayne, who was hit in the quarter panel by Harvick which triggered the wreck, accused him of intentionally spinning him out to secure a spot in the next round. Kevin Harvick and his crew chief, Rodney Childers, claimed that they had tried to move out of the way during the restart, knowing that their engine was failing. In the first race of the Round of 8, Harvick finished 8th at Martinsville. The next week at Texas, he managed to finish 3rd, despite having a faulty shifter which forced him to drive with one hand for the last several laps.

At Homestead, Harvick came up one spot short of the championship, finishing 2nd in the race and the championship to Kyle Busch. With 3 laps to go, Harvick was closing in on Busch but ran out of time, finishing 2nd to him by 1.5 seconds.

Despite his second-place finish in the championship, Harvick had led the point standings for much of the regular season from the third race of the season at Las Vegas to the Federated Auto Parts 400 at Richmond (a span of 24 races). After the latter race, he fell to fourth in the standings, allowing Johnson to take over in the top spot. He then fell to 15th (11 positions back) after the Chicagoland race as Matt Kenseth took over the points lead. After the fall Martinsville race, Harvick went back up to fourth in the standings. When the fall Phoenix race was shortened due to rain, Harvick retook the points lead.

2016

In the 2016 Daytona 500, Harvick stayed upfront during a majority of the race and would end up finishing 4th.

Harvick would earn his first win of the season at Phoenix by beating Carl Edwards in a photo finish by a margin of 0.10, the closest finish in the track's history. The win was Harvick's eighth win at Phoenix.

Over the next several weeks, Harvick finished consistently in the Top 10. His first DNF of the season would soon come at Daytona, where he was involved in a big accident on lap 90. Another rough race would come five weeks later at Watkins Glen, due to heavy contact from David Ragan after spinning out with 7 laps to go. The next week, Harvick would nab his second win of the season at Bristol, where he held off Ricky Stenhouse Jr. for the last 50 laps of the race.

In the first race of the Chase for the Sprint Cup at Chicagoland, Harvick would start at the rear of the field due to unapproved body modifications but quickly moved back up to the front within 30 laps. He would be put a lap down due to an untimely caution while Harvick was on pit road because he did not beat the leader, Martin Truex Jr., to the start-finish line. He never got back on the lead lap for the remainder of the race, and ultimately finished 20th. Harvick's third win of the season would come at the very next week at Loudon, where he passed Matt Kenseth on a late-race restart with 7 laps to go. Next week at Dover, Harvick would have a broken track bar and would have to go to the garage but he was already locked into the next round due to his win at New Hampshire. The next week at Charlotte, Harvick would win the pole and would lead 155 laps before having electrical problems on lap 154 at the same time Joey Logano had a tire problem and hit the wall. Coming into Kansas, Harvick sat 12th in the Chase standings and would be in a must-win situation to make the round of 8, but that was no problem for Harvick as he would dominate the race along with Matt Kenseth until Kenseth would fade after tapping the wall. Harvick would lead 267 laps to victory, late in the race, Carl Edwards, would get the lead and lead several laps, but after a few cautions and restarts, Harvick would get back the lead and while Edwards and Kyle Busch would battle hard for 2nd place, Harvick would pull away to get his 4th win of the season, and advance into the Round of 8 in the Chase but he would officially get eliminated in the Round of 8. He would wrap up his 2016 season by winning the pole and finishing 3rd at Homestead-Miami.

2017

For 2017, Stewart-Haas switched from Chevrolet to Ford. Harvick went on to win Stage 2 and lead the most laps in the 2017 Daytona 500. A large wreck on lap 129 would hinder Harvick from topping his solid day off, and would ultimately finish 22nd. Next week at Atlanta, Harvick continued his momentum by capturing the pole position. Once the green flag waved, Harvick held the lead and didn't look back. He would go on to lead 292 out of 325 laps, a race-high for him, and he would also sweep both race stages. With less than 20 to go, Austin Dillon's car received a power failure, setting up a late-race caution. The field would pit, and Harvick would receive a devastating pit road penalty. This put him at the tail end of the longest line and would prevent him from closing out the race and winning yet again. Harvick would only advance up to the 9th position. Despite his disappointing performances, he would lead the points standings heading out of Atlanta due to his stage wins and consistency during the two races.

Harvick raced in the K&N Pro Series West event at Sonoma Raceway, his first race in the series since Iowa Speedway in 2007, driving the No. 4 for Jefferson Pitts Racing. Harvick took the lead from Michael Self on lap 42 to win the race. A day later, he won the Toyota/Save Mart 350 to sweep the weekend, his second-ever road course win, and first at Sonoma. Teammate Clint Bowyer finished second to mark a Stewart-Haas 1–2. During the chase, Harvick struggled during the first round finishing 36th at Loudon and 17th at Dover. Though his playoff points and stage points saved him from elimination. The second round fared slightly better for Harvick though he did suffer a DNF at Talladega, again his stage points would keep him from elimination. Harvick finished 5th at Martinsville after sliding to the finish after last-lap contact. The following week at Texas, Harvick would win stage 1, lead a total of 35 laps, and win the race. Harvick's win would secure him a spot in the Championship 4 at Homestead. The win was also Harvick's first at Texas, leaving Kentucky and Pocono as the only tracks Harvick has yet to win. The following week at Phoenix, Harvick finished 5th. This marked the first season since 2011 where Harvick didn't win a race at Phoenix. In the season finale at Homestead, Harvick started strong, leading the championship at one point, however, after hitting some debris and losing the handle of the car, Harvick was unable to run with the leaders Truex and Busch during the final green-flag run. He finished 4th in the race and 3rd in the final standings. With the retirements of Dale Jr. and Matt Kenseth, Harvick and his long-time rival Jimmie Johnson became the oldest full-time drivers in the Cup Series.

2018

Harvick would start the 2018 season with a DNF at the Daytona 500, after being involved in a crash just halfway through the race finishing 31st, but would earn dominant back-to-back wins at Atlanta (his first since 2001) and Las Vegas. This would be the first time Harvick would earn back-to-back wins since 2015 where he won at Las Vegas and Phoenix. It would also be his 100th career win across NASCAR's top three series. However, his win at Las Vegas would not count toward the playoffs as he received an L1 penalty for the rear window of the car not being braced at all times. He has docked 20 points, crew chief Childers fined $50,000 and car chief Robert Smith suspended for the next two races. Despite Childers being absent in the Phoenix race and the penalty from last week, Harvick was able to score his 40th career win and would finally earn three wins in a row after four previous attempts, for the first time in his career. Coming to California, four in a row would not work for Harvick, as he was involved in a wreck with Kyle Larson early in the race, and would finish 35th place, nine laps down. He finished fifth at Martinsville, second at Texas, seventh at Bristol, fifth at Richmond, and fourth at Talladega. At Dover, Harvick dominated by leading the most laps and scoring his fourth win of the year. The following week at Kansas, he was again dominant, scoring the pole, finishing second in both stages, and taking the lead with two laps to go to win his fifth race of the season. This tied the most wins for Harvick in a season. Harvick was the first driver to win five of the first 13 races since Jeff Gordon in 1997. A week later in the All-Star Race, Harvick continued his winning streak yet again, winning stages 1 and 3 and held off Daniel Suárez to win for the first time in 11 years after winning it in 2007 driving the No. 29 car for RCR. Over the next seven races, Harvick would finish outside the top five only twice: at Charlotte after a tire failure, and Daytona after getting caught in an Overtime wreck. At New Hampshire, Harvick stayed in the top 10 for most of the race and with less than 15 to go, Harvick used the bump and run on Kyle Busch and held onto the lead to get his sixth win of the year, the best in his career. He finished fourth at Pocono and 10th at Watkins Glen. Coming into Michigan, Harvick had finished second six times since winning there in 2010. He won both stages and led 108 laps en route to his seventh win of the season.

In the playoffs, Harvick earned consistent finishes and used playoff points to advance himself toward the Round of 8, where he earned his eighth win of the season at Texas after winning both stages 1 and 2. However, he was penalized 40 points and had the win encumbered due to a spoiler infraction post-race, which put him 3 points above the cut-line heading to Phoenix. Harvick overcame a flat tire during the Phoenix race to secure enough points to make the Championship 4 at Homestead. In the season finale, Harvick ran up front for most of the early part of the race but his car got loose as the night went on. Harvick found himself in a position to win the race after pit strategy got him the lead in the final stage of the race but an ill-timed caution cost him the win. Harvick battled for the lead on the final restart but got overtaken by eventual winner Joey Logano. Harvick stated "We just got beat tonight" after the race. He finished the season third in the points standings, winning a career-high eight races and tying Kyle Busch for the most wins of the year.

2019

Harvick started his 2019 season by winning Duel 1 of the 2019 Gander RV Duels at Daytona. He finished 26th at the 2019 Daytona 500 after a late crash. Following Daytona, Harvick went on to finish in the top 10 6 straight times including 3 top-fives. Following Texas was an up-and-down stretch that lasted until race #19. At Bristol Motor Speedway, he finished a mediocre 13th after getting through traffic. Richmond was not bad as he was consistently in the top 5 all night and finished 4th. Things took a hard turn at Talladega where he earned his second DNF of the season, all on SuperSpeedways. Harvick bounced back with a 4th-place finish at Dover. He got the pole at Kansas and looked as if he was going to win but a poor stop by his crew members regulated him to finish 13th instead. Harvick almost won the All-Star race but finished second behind Kyle Larson. He then finished 10th at the Coca-Cola 600. A loose wheel at Pocono made him suffer a 22nd-place finish. Then in the next two races, he finished inside the top 7. He then finished outside the top 10 in the next three races. At Chicagoland, Harvick did well in both stages but a loose wheel got him to finish a mediocre 14th-place finish. Then next weekend, he finished 29th after getting collected in the Big One but still was able to run at the finish line driving his wrecked car. Then Kentucky was worse as he finished 22nd again. Heading into New Hampshire, Harvick had decent numbers but still was winless throughout the season after 19 races. Then in the next 7 races, he finished in the top 7 in 6 races. His only finish outside the top 10 was at Bristol as he suffered a DNF thanks to a transmission problem. He added this great momentum with wins at New Hampshire, Michigan, and Indianapolis. His Playoffs was also consistent as in the Round of 16, he finished 2nd at Las Vegas, 7th at Richmond, and finished third at the Charlotte Roval to advance to the Round of 12 and his average finish during those three races in the Round of 16 was an insane 4.0 during that stretch. At Talladega, Harvick made his 677th career start in the Cup Series, one more than the total career starts of Dale Earnhardt. His worse finish during the Playoffs was 17th at Talladega, after getting collected in the Big One but once again was able to finish the race. He scored his fourth win of the season at Texas to make his fifth appearance in the Championship 4 in the last six years. He went on to finish third in the standings for the third year in a row after finishing fourth at Homestead.

2020: Regular Season Championship 

To start the 2020 season, Harvick finished fourth in Duel 2 of the Bluegreen Vacations Duels at Daytona. Despite sustaining minor damage, he finished fifth at the Daytona 500, his first top-five in the race since 2016. He stayed consistently in the top 10 at Las Vegas, Fontana, and Phoenix before the season was halted due to the COVID-19 pandemic.

On February 22, Harvick and Camping World CEO Marcus Lemonis offered a 100,000 reward to any full-time Cup Series driver who can beat Kyle Busch in the Truck Series. Corey LaJoie, Austin Dillon, Landon Cassill, and Timmy Hill were among those who showed interest in the challenge. Chase Elliott ultimately took up the bounty and won it in the Truck Series' first race back from the season pause at Charlotte.

When racing resumed on May 17, Harvick scored his 50th career win at The Real Heroes 400 at Darlington. The win allowed him to surpass his car owner Tony Stewart to become the 12th winningest driver in Cup Series history. Further victories came during the summer in the Folds of Honor QuikTrip 500 at Atlanta (where he celebrated in a similar manner to his 2001 victory there), the Pocono Organics 325 at Pocono (his first win at the track), the Brickyard 400 at Indianapolis (after fellow championship contender Denny Hamlin blew a tire late), and a sweep of the Michigan doubleheader (becoming the first driver to win Cup races on back-to-back days since Richard Petty in 1971).

Following his seventh win of the season in the second Drydene 311 at Dover International Speedway, Harvick clinched the regular-season championship.

After a 20th-place finish at Daytona, Harvick opened the first round of the playoffs on a high note by holding off Austin Dillon to win his second Southern 500 and outdueled Kyle Busch two weeks later to win the Bristol Night Race for the second time in his career, becoming the first driver to win at least nine times in a season since Carl Edwards in 2008. Despite these achievements, Harvick was eliminated in the Round of 8 after finishing 17th at Martinsville. He finished fifth in the points standings, and went the entire season without a DNF for only the fourth time in his career.

2021: Fourth winless season and feud with Chase Elliott

Harvick began the 2021 Cup season with three consecutive top-ten finishes and was one of two drivers to do that, the other being Michael McDowell. His streak ended in the fourth race at Las Vegas when he finished 20th after starting on the pole. Harvick finished 37th at the inaugural Circuit of the Americas race after Bubba Wallace collided with him under rainy conditions, sustaining his first DNF since the 2019 Bass Pro Shops NRA Night Race. He, later on, criticized NASCAR for allowing the race to proceed with poor visibility. Despite scoring no wins for the first time since 2009, Harvick managed to make the playoffs with his consistency.

In March, he returned to the Truck Series for the first time since 2015 when he joined David Gilliland Racing to drive their No. 17 in the Bristol dirt race. Stewart-Haas also brought back their second Xfinity car for Harvick to run three road course races at Circuit of the Americas, Road America, and the Indianapolis Road Course, all of which were new to the Cup Series schedule that year. He ended up in the Nos. 5 and 99 for B. J. McLeod Motorsports in collaboration with Stewart-Haas Racing.

Despite lacking the bonus points of the other playoff contenders, Harvick stayed consistent enough to make it to the Round of 12. At the Bristol Night Race, he tangled with Chase Elliott, causing the latter to fall out of contention after cutting a tire. Harvick led the race on the closing laps, but a lapped Elliott created enough traffic to slow down Harvick, allowing Kyle Larson to overtake him for the win. This resulted in a heated verbal confrontation between Harvick and Elliott after the race. Neither driver was reprimanded by NASCAR. During the Charlotte Roval race, Harvick bumped Elliott and sent him to the wall with rear-end damage. Harvick later experienced brake failure and crashed head-on to the turn 1 wall. As a result, he was eliminated from the Round of 12, the earliest elimination from Playoff contention in his career. Despite this and going winless for the first time since 2009, he once again finished fifth in the final standings.

2022: Highs and lows with the Next-Gen

Harvick began the 2022 season with a 30th place finish at the 2022 Daytona 500. Aside from four DNFs, he stayed consistent with his finishes until he won at Michigan, breaking a 65-race drought to become the 15th different winner in the season. Harvick then scored his 60th career victory at Richmond a week later. At the Southern 500, Harvick finished 33rd after his car caught fire, which resulted in being relegated to 16th and last in the Playoff standings. The following week at Kansas, Harvick slammed the wall on lap 33 after Ross Chastain made contact with Bubba Wallace, resulting in Harvick's third consecutive DNF for the first time in his career. Harvick was eliminated in the Round of 16 after finishing 10th and being in a must-win situation at the Bristol night race. On October 5, Childers was suspended for four races and fined 100,000 for an L2 Penalty during post-race inspection after the Talladega playoff race. The penalty came under Sections 14.1 (vehicle assembly) and 14.5 (body) in the NASCAR Rule Book, both of which pertain to the body and overall vehicle assembly rules surrounding modification of a single-source supplied part. In addition, the No. 4 team was docked 100 driver and owner points. Harvick finished the season 15th in the points standings, his first points finish outside the top 10 since 2009.

2023: Final full-time season
On January 12, 2023, Harvick announced he will retire at the end of the 2023 season. He started the season with a 12th place finish at the 2023 Daytona 500. For his final appearance at the NASCAR All-Star Race, Harvick's car will use the No. 29 and a throwback paint scheme honoring his first career win at Atlanta in 2001.

Other racing

American Canadian Tour and ARCA Bondo/Mar-Hyde Series
On July 21, 2008, Harvick won $37,300 at the 35th annual TD Bank 250 presented by New England Dodge Dealers in Oxford, Maine. Harvick defeated tour regulars; Glen Luce and Joey Polewarczyk Jr to become the first active NASCAR Sprint Cup Series driver to win the 250. The event is traditionally one of New England's major short track races. Since his 1998 West Series championship, he has competed in four races with one win. He also made two starts in the ARCA Bondo/Mar-Hyde Series in 1999 for Childress in the No. 20 Invinca-Shields/Realtree Chevrolet, finishing in the top-five both times.

CARS Tour
On January 9, 2023, a consortium consisting of Kevin Harvick Incorporated, DEJ Management, Jeff Burton Autosports, Inc., and Trackhouse Racing Team purchased the CARS Tour.

Broadcasting career
On January 25, 2015, it was reported that Harvick, along with Jeff Gordon, Brad Keselowski, and Danica Patrick, would serve as a rotating analyst for Xfinity Series races with NASCAR on Fox. Harvick was the first of the four to commentate, starting at Daytona; he also worked at Las Vegas, Dover, and the Truck Series race at Talladega.

In June 2017, Harvick was the play-by-play commentator for the Fox NASCAR broadcast of the Xfinity race at Pocono as part of a Cup drivers-only coverage, he worked alongside Joey Logano and Clint Bowyer in the broadcast booth. Fox brought back the Drivers Only broadcast in 2018 at Talladega and 2019 at Charlotte in May, and the trio reprised their roles in the booth both years.

Harvick was not one of Fox's guest analysts in 2020, and "Drivers Only" was not done that year due to the COVID-19 pandemic. However, in 2021, Harvick was included in the lineup of guest analysts, and he served as a color commentator at Darlington in May.

Personal life

Harvick married DeLana (Linville) Harvick on February 28, 2001, in Las Vegas, Nevada, shortly after his Cup Series debut. They had met the previous year at Michigan International Speedway where at the time she was working in public relations for fellow driver Randy LaJoie. DeLana had worked in a similar capacity for Jeff Gordon previously and had even dabbled in race driving herself. DeLana is an active participant in Harvick's career, co-owning and working with KHI Management LLC, as well as frequently appearing on Harvick's pit box during Cup races.

The couple live in Charlotte, North Carolina with their son Keelan, who was born on July 8, 2012, and daughter Piper Harvick, born on December 28, 2017. Keelan competes in kart racing. In April 2021, Keelan joined his father in an eNASCAR iRacing Pro Invitational Series race.

Harvick is an avid fan of the Philadelphia Flyers of the NHL. He also stated during the ESPN broadcast of the 2011 5-hour Energy 500, while there was a rain delay, that he was a fan of the New York Yankees baseball team. On August 10, 2011, Harvick threw out the ceremonial first pitch between the Yankees and the Los Angeles Angels at Yankee Stadium.

Kevin Harvick Foundation
Established in 2010 by Harvick and his wife, DeLana, the mission of the Kevin Harvick Foundation (KHF) is to support programs that enrich the lives of children throughout the United States.  The foundation works to not only improve the quality of life, but to help underprivileged youth find and realize their dreams by supporting programs such as the Kevin Harvick Athletic Scholarship Fund at California State University, Bakersfield, a camper cabin at Victory Junction, Baptist Children's Homes of NC, Boys & Girls Clubs, and Kevin's Krew.

In media
Harvick has made several TV talk show appearances during his career on shows such as Late Show with David Letterman, Live with Regis and Kelly, Jim Rome is Burning, and The Tony Danza Show. He was also on the first season of FX's NASCAR Drivers: 360. It took an in-depth look at NASCAR drivers outside the track and the preparation it takes to be a NASCAR driver. Harvick has also been on MTV Cribs.

In early 2003 Harvick is featured on the cover NASCAR Racing 2003 Season alongside Jimmie Johnson.

In 2004, game show Family Feud hosted a NASCAR special involving Harvick, with help from fellow Californian and then-host Richard Karn. In the special, Harvick faced off against fellow race-car driver Jeremy Mayfield and his foundation, playing Family Feud on behalf of the Kevin Harvick Foundation. Although they did not win, Harvick and his team were able to score off 276 points, winning $276 for their charity.

On February 19, 2011, Harvick's sponsor, Budweiser hosted "The Roast of Kevin Harvick", which had some of Harvick's opponents and teammates give their thoughts and opinions on the Sprint Cup driver.

Nicknames
Harvick was nicknamed "Happy Harvick" ironically due to his occasional temper outbursts. His pit sign, which is a smiley face, is a play on the nickname. He also received the nickname "The Closer" for his ability to make late passes for the win (often with the commentators asking "Where did he come from?" because he often made them from a considerable distance behind, usually taking advantage of the leader running out of fuel in the last few corners).

Motorsports career results

NASCAR
(key) (Bold – Pole position awarded by qualifying time.  – Pole position earned by points standings or practice time. * – Most laps led.)

Cup Series

Daytona 500

Xfinity Series

Camping World Truck Series

 Season still in progress 
 Ineligible for series championship points

K&N Pro Series West

 Season still in progress.
 Ineligible for series championship points.

ARCA Bondo/Mar-Hyde Series
(key) (Bold – Pole position awarded by qualifying time. Italics – Pole position earned by points standings or practice time. * – Most laps led.)

24 Hours of Daytona 
(key)

International Race of Champions
(key) (Bold – Pole position. * – Most laps led.)

See also
List of 2014 motorsport champions
List of all-time NASCAR Cup Series winners
List of NASCAR Nationwide Series champions
List of NASCAR race wins by Kevin Harvick
List of NASCAR Sprint All-Star Race drivers
List of NASCAR Sprint Cup Series champions
List of people from Bakersfield, California

References

External links
 
 
 
 Kevin Harvick Foundation

 
Living people
1975 births
Racing drivers from Bakersfield, California
24 Hours of Daytona drivers
Motorsport announcers
NASCAR Cup Series champions
NASCAR drivers
NASCAR Xfinity Series champions
NASCAR team owners
ARCA Menards Series drivers
ARCA Midwest Tour drivers
American Speed Association drivers
International Race of Champions drivers
Bakersfield College alumni
Richard Childress Racing drivers
Stewart-Haas Racing drivers
JR Motorsports drivers
NASCAR Cup Series regular season champions